St. Paul's Episcopal School is an independent, parochial, co-educational Christian preparatory school in Mobile, Alabama.

Description
The school has a four-level structure: the Lower School (Pre-K through 2nd grade), the Intermediate School (3rd grade and 4th grade), the Middle School (5th grade through 8th grade), and the Upper School (9th grade through 12th grade).

The main campus houses the Intermediate School, Middle School, and Upper School grade-levels. The main building, off Dogwood Lane, can be found on "The Horseshoe." "The Horseshoe" is a looping driveway that surrounds Saints' Square, a memorial-square and common meeting place on the school's campus. Also located on the main campus are buildings containing 85 classrooms, auxiliary buildings, two gymnasiums, a football field and track, a baseball field, a softball field, multiple practice fields, and a cafeteria.

The Lower School campus is separate from the school's main campus and can be found 0.4 miles down Old Shell Road at the same location as the church associated with the school.

Athletics 

St. Paul's has won a total of 200 Alabama state championships in 18 sports, including: baseball, girls' basketball, girls' cross-country, boys' cross-country, football, boys' golf, girls' golf, girls' indoor track, boys' indoor track, girls' soccer, girls' swimming and diving, boys' swimming and diving, girls' tennis, boys' tennis, girls' outdoor track, boys' outdoor track, volleyball, and girls' heptathlon.

St. Paul's also has a long-standing athletic rivalry  with UMS-Wright, another local private high school that is just 2.2 miles away down Old Shell Road. In football, the two teams meet every year in the "Battle of Old Shell Road."

St. Paul's has been coined as being a "Pathway to the pros" by regional news media in recent years referring to the vast number of  professional athletes who were local stars appearing first at SPS athletic events.

Notable alumni 
Mark Barron (2008), Strong Safety for the Los Angeles Rams, drafted by Tampa Bay with the 7th overall pick in 2012 NFL Draft
Jacob Coker (2011), former quarterback for the Alabama Crimson Tide and the Florida State University Seminoles.
Walker Hayes (1998)- singer/songwriter
Destin Hood (2008), Professional baseball player for the Miami Marlins
Chevis Jackson (2004), Former defensive back for the Atlanta Falcons (2008 to 2009) and the Jacksonville Jaguars (2010) of the National Football League.
Tiger Jones (American football) (1999), wide receiver for the Philadelphia Soul
A. J. McCarron (2009), Current Quarterback for the Buffalo Bills, Former National Championship Winning Quarterback for the Alabama Crimson Tide
Kyle McPherson (2004), Starting pitcher for the Pittsburgh Pirates
Jake Peavy (1999), 2007 NL Cy Young Award Winner, two-time MLB All-Star starting pitcher for the San Francisco Giants
Zack Sucher (2005), professional golfer on PGA Tour

References

External links
 St. Paul's Episcopal School Page
 

Episcopal schools in the United States
Schools in Mobile, Alabama
Preparatory schools in Alabama
Educational institutions established in 1947
1947 establishments in Alabama